Toulépleu is a town in the far west of Ivory Coast, near the border with Liberia. It is a sub-prefecture and the seat of Toulépleu Department in Cavally Region, Montagnes District. Toulépleu is also a commune.

Notes

Sub-prefectures of Cavally Region
Communes of Cavally Region